{{Infobox album
| name       = Out of My Hands
| type       = studio
| artist     = Morten Harket
| cover      = Morten Harket - Out Of My Hands.jpg
| border     = yes
| alt        =
| released   = 
| recorded   = Norway(Ljunggren Studio, Snowdrop Studios)England(Real World Studios)Sweden(Studio Brun, Quant Studios)
| venue      =
| studio     =
| genre      = Synthpop, pop rock
| length     = 37:44
| label      = Universal, Island, We Love Music
| producer   = Morten Harket, Lars Hustoft, Peter Kvint, Erik Ljunggren, Steve Osborne, Jonas Quant
| prev_title = Letter from Egypt
| prev_year  = 2008
| next_title = Brother
| next_year  = 2014
| misc       = 
{{Singles
 | name        = Out of My Hands (UK)
 | type        = studio
 | single1     = Scared of Heights
 | single1date = 14 May 2012
 | single2     = I'm the One
 | single2date = 9 July 2012
 | single3     = Burn Money Burn
 | single3date = 29 October 2012
}}
}}Out of My Hands is the fifth studio album and third English-language album by Norwegian pop singer Morten Harket. It was released on April 13, 2012 through Island Records. The album was mainly produced by British record producer Steve Osborne, who worked with a-ha on their ninth studio album, Foot of the Mountain (2009). Upon its release, the album received generally mixed reviews from Norwegian music critics. The album charted at number one in Norway, becoming the singer's third number-one album there.

Critical reception

Nick Levine of the BBC gave the album a favourable review, and wrote: "There's a similar dignity to Morten Harket's first solo album since the split. It's a grown-up synth-pop affair featuring songs that vary in pace all the way from a fairly slow mid-tempo to, ooh, a fairly fast mid-tempo. Actually, Out of My Hands doesn't sound too different from the last few a-ha albums, but it's also fresh enough to recall Echoes, Will Young's stellar electro-pop LP from last year."

In his  review for Daily Express'', Simon Gage gave the album three out of five stars writing, "The famous falsetto is still very much in evidence and the songs strong if a little on the dated side with driving guitars and lush orchestrations making it sound remarkably a-ha-esque."

Track listing 

Notes
 Original Swedish lyrics by Joakim Berg, English lyrics by Morten Harket.

Charts

Release history

References

2012 albums
Island Records albums
Morten Harket albums
Albums produced by Steve Osborne